Where's Charley? is a 1952 British musical comedy film directed by David Butler. It starred Ray Bolger, Allyn Ann McLerie and Robert Shackleton. It is an adaptation of the musical Where's Charley?, which was in turn based on the 1892 play Charley's Aunt by Brandon Thomas.

Bolger, McLerie and Horace Cooper reprised the performances they originated on Broadway. Produced by the British branch of Warner Brothers, it was shot at Teddington Studios in London. Some scenes were filmed on location in Oxford the setting for the comedy. The film's sets were designed by the art directors David Ffolkes and Albert Witherick.
Despite a leading role here, this was one of only two films made by Robert Shackleton (1914-1956), the other being “Wonder Boy” (1951).  With its run at New York’s Radio City Music Hall, he appeared in the stage show.

It earned an estimated $1.5 million at the North American box office in 1952.

Cast
 Ray Bolger as Charley Wykeham
 Allyn Ann McLerie as Amy Spettigue
 Robert Shackleton as Jack Chesney
 Horace Cooper as Stephen Spettigue
 Margaretta Scott as Dona Lucia
 Howard Marion-Crawford as Sir Francis Chesney
 Mary Germaine as Kitty Verdun
 Henry Hewitt as Brassett
 H. G. Stoker as Wilkinson
 Martin Miller as Photographer
 Neville Phillips as 	Student

References

Bibliography
 Thomas G. Aylesworth. The Best of Warner Bros. Brompton, 1994.

External links

1952 films
British musical comedy films
1952 musical comedy films
Films based on Charley's Aunt
Films directed by David Butler
Films scored by Ray Heindorf
Films set in Oxford
Warner Bros. films
Films shot at Teddington Studios
Films set in the 1890s
British historical comedy films
1950s historical comedy films
British historical musical films
Films based on musicals
1950s English-language films
1950s British films